Jodie Lee Stimpson (born 8 February 1989) is a British professional triathlete who also currently competes in the Iron Man distance of the sport. In 2013, she finished runner up in the ITU World Triathlon Series. She has won 3 global titles during her career. 

She was also Aquathlon World Champion of the year 2006, U23 vice Triathlon World Champion of the year 2008, 2009 British Triathlon Champion and 2010 British Triathlon Super Series winner.

In the prestigious French Club Championship Series Lyonnaise des Eaux, Stimpson represents Poissy Tri. In 2010, however, Stimpson took part in only one Lyonnaise triathlon, the Triathlon de Paris, and won the gold medal. Together with Erin Densham (Australia) and Jodie Swallow (Great Britain) she won the silver medal for her French club.

In 2011, Jodie won her 1st World title in Triathlon when part of the GB team which took Gold at the World Mixed Relay Championship.

On 24 July 2014, Stimpson won her 1st Individual Global title, with Gold at the 2014 Commonwealth Games in the Triathlon.	

Stimpson took gold in the mixed triathlon team relay at the 2014 Commonwealth Games, with the Brownlee brothers, Alistair and Jonathan, and Vicky Holland.

ITU Competitions 
In the six years from 2005 to 2010 Stimpson took part in 17 ITU competitions and achieved six top ten positions.
The following list is based upon the official ITU rankings and the Athlete's Profile Page.
Unless indicated otherwise the following events are triathlons (Olympic Distance) and belong to the Elite category.

DNF = did not finish · DNS = did not start

Notes

External links 
 Jodie Stimpson's Homepage
 Jodie Stimpson's historical results

British female triathletes
1989 births
Living people
Commonwealth Games gold medallists for England
People from Oldbury, West Midlands
Triathletes at the 2014 Commonwealth Games
Commonwealth Games medallists in triathlon
Sportspeople from the West Midlands (county)
English expatriate sportspeople in France
Medallists at the 2014 Commonwealth Games